Belgium made its Paralympic Games début at the inaugural Paralympic Games in Rome in 1960, and has participated in every edition of the Summer Paralympics. It also took part in the inaugural Winter Paralympics in 1976 in Örnsköldsvik, and has competed in every edition of the Winter Games except 1980, 1998 and 2002.

Belgian athletes have won a total of 98 Paralympic medals, of which 27 gold, 37 silver and 34 bronze, placing it 25th on the all-time Paralympic Games medal table.

Belgium's best result at the Summer Games came in 1984, when it finished 12th on the medal table, with its largest ever haul of medals: 57, of which 22 gold. Its worst result came in 2008, with just one bronze medal, placing it 69th on the medal table.

At the Winter Games, Belgium has won two bronze medals: a bronze obtained by Willy Mercier in the Men's Super-G (B1 category) in alpine skiing in 1994  and Eléonor Sana won a bronze medal in the women's visually impaired downhill in 2018.

Multi medallists
Belgian multi medallists who have won at least three medals.

Medals

Summer Paralympic Games

Winter Paralympic Games

See also
 Belgium at the Olympics

References